The M42 Duperite helmet was a paratrooper helmet issued to Australian paratroopers during WW2. The helmet got its eponymous name from the shock impact-absorbing material it was composed of. It was similar to the first of the British dispatch rider helmets.

References

 http://nuke.combat-helmets.com/Default.aspx?tabid=88 M42 Duperite helmet

External links 
 

Combat helmets of Australia
Australian headgear
Military equipment introduced from 1940 to 1944